Jack D. Woodall  (born 1 August 1936) is a retired lieutenant general in the United States Army whose assignments included commander United States Army Japan, and 2nd Infantry Division

References

1936 births
Living people
United States Army generals